The Giraffes is the third full-length album by the hard rock band The Giraffes. It was released on Razor & Tie, and is their first record with the company. The track "Honey Baby Child" was written by and recorded in memory of Pierre Michel.

Track listing

All songs written by the Giraffes, except "Honey Baby Child" written by Pierre Michel

"Jr. At His Worst" – 4:31
"Wage Earner" – 2:24
"Haunted Heaven" – 3:37
"Man U." – 5:14
"Having Fun" – 3:38
"Sugarbomb" – 5:16
"BLCKNTWHTCSTL" – 3:47
"Million $ Man" – 4:44
"79 & Weightless" – 4:24
"Honey Baby Child" – 5:45

Personnel

 Damien Paris – guitar, vocals
 Andrew Totolos – drums, vocals
 John Rosenthal – bass, piano, vocals
 Aaron Lazar – lead vocals, engravings
 Jason Martin – engineer
 Joel Hamilton – additional tracking, mixing & fixing, additional vocals
 Mike Jansson – additional vocals
 Chris Dell'Olio – additional vocals
 Jeremy Dillahunt – additional vocals
 Frank Callaghan – additional vocals
 Bennet Callaghan – additional vocals
 James SK Wān – bamboo flute
 Tzgani Design – album design
 Todd Kancar – album design, additional vocals
 Andreaus Vesalius – engravings
 Chris Dell'Olio at Mastermind Management – management

2005 albums
Razor & Tie albums
The Giraffes (Brooklyn band) albums